Douglas Alan Stromback (born March 3, 1967) is an American retired ice hockey right winger who played over 380 regular season and playoff games across several minor hockey leagues. Stromback was drafted in the sixth round of the 1985 NHL Entry Draft, selected 124th overall, by the Washington Capitals.

Career
Stromback was invited to Detroit Red Wings training camp in 1988, but was eventually reassigned to their AHL affiliate on September 20, 1988. After arriving in Erie for the 1988-89 ECHL season, Stromback scored a career-high 40 goals in 50 games, which earned him a spot on the 1988-89 All-ECHL Team.

Stromback's younger brother Richard also played professional hockey. Both Doug and Richard played professional hockey for the Erie Panthers during the 1989-90 ECHL season.

Personal
Once he retired from hockey, Stromback attended Brandon University in Brandon, Manitoba, and received a Bachelor of Arts in Business Administration in 1995.

After his graduation, Stromback became an investor and board member of Web Group. Stromback later started a career in structured finance. Over the course of five years, he became a top executive with over $500 million in transactions.

Career statistics

References

External links

StrombackFilms.com

1967 births
American men's ice hockey right wingers
American people of Finnish descent
American people of Swedish descent
Bakersfield Fog players
Belleville Bulls players
Huntington Blizzard players
Erie Panthers players
Flint Spirits players
Ice hockey players from Michigan
Johnstown Chiefs players
Kitchener Rangers players
Living people
Memphis RiverKings players
Muskegon Fury players
North Bay Centennials players
Tulsa Oilers (1992–present) players
Utica Blizzard players
People from Farmington, Michigan
Brandon University alumni
Washington Capitals draft picks